Quiet parties (also known as silent parties or silent dating parties) are nightclub events where participants socialize by writing notes to each other instead of speaking. The single rule at these events is "no talking".

History
The concept is believed to have been created in 2002 by artist Paul Rebhan and musician Tony Noe, two friends who visited several bars in New York City in an attempt to have a conversation, only to find they could not hear each other speak at any bar because of loud music and loud talking. This experience prompted them to invent the concept of 'silent nightclubbing'.

The first Quiet Party was probably in October 2002 in New York City, and the concept spread to other cities including San Francisco, Washington, Houston, Paris, London, Berlin, Barcelona and Beijing.

Quiet Parties arrived as one of the first of a new wave of unorthodox social activities of the early 2000s that merged elements of traditional party promotion with aspects of performance art. Others in this genre include Smart Mobs, Flash Mobs, and Cuddle Parties.

External links
 https://web.archive.org/web/20070612074357/http://nypress.com/19/21/summerguide/sex1.cfm NYpress article
 http://www.wordspy.com/words/quietparty.asp Wordspy references

Parties
Dating